Archbishop Denis O'Connor Catholic High School (abbreviated DO'C) is a Roman Catholic high school located in Ajax, Ontario, Canada, within the Durham Catholic District School Board.  It is named for Archbishop Denis T. O'Connor, a priest who was born in Pickering in 1841, and who became the third Archbishop of Toronto, Ontario, Canada in 1899. The school has students in grades 9–12 and offers a wide range of academic and extracurricular activities. The current enrollment is approximately 600 students. The school colours are green and yellow, and its motto is Nil sine fide et labore, which is Latin for "Nothing without faith and work."

In 2014, the school celebrated the 50th anniversary of its opening in 1964.

History
Archbishop Denis O'Connor Catholic High School was founded by Father Leo J. Austin and was officially opened in September, 1964 in Whitby, Ontario. The school was moved to its new home of Ajax in 1984. On November 18, 1984, it was officially opened and blessed by Cardinal Carter.  In 1991 a major addition was constructed which increased its capacity to approximately 1,000 students.

Athletics
The school is home to a wide variety of athletic and academic activities. It has highly talented sports teams, such as their senior boys basketball team and Varsity Boys Baseball Team. The senior boys' soccer team has proved to be one of the most successful teams in the Durham Region, winning five Lake Ontario Secondary School Association (LOSSA) championships in a row.

Associate Schools
The school's students generally come from the following Catholic Elementary Schools which are all located in Ajax:
 St. Jude Catholic Elementary School
 St. James Catholic Elementary School, 
 St. Francis de Sales Catholic Elementary School
 St. Bernadette Catholic Elementary School
 Mother Teresa Catholic Elementary School.

Notable alumni and groups

 Devin Shore,  National Hockey League
 Paul Peschisolido, retired professional soccer player
 Candace Chapman, women's professional soccer player, member of the Canada women's national soccer team and Olympian, Olympic bronze medalist 
 Toya Alexis, Canadian R&B vocalist
 Ruby Bhatia, India's first music veejay
 Keith Godding, Wide Receiver, Toronto Argonauts
 Michael Kostka, Ottawa Senators, Toronto Maples Leafs

See also
List of high schools in Ontario

References

External links
 Archbishop Denis O'Connor Catholic High School Website
 Durham Catholic District School Board
 Archbishop Denis O'Connor Catholic High School Board Profile
Archbishop Denis O'Connor Catholic High School Ministry of Education Profile

High schools in the Regional Municipality of Durham
Ajax, Ontario
Educational institutions established in 1964
1964 establishments in Ontario